"Surrender" is the fourth single from Canadian music group Billy Talent off their triple platinum selling album, Billy Talent II.  The single was released on April 2, 2007.

The music video for it was shot in early February by Phil Harder.

Track listing

UK 5" Single 

 "Surrender" (Radio Version)
 "This Suffering" (Live at The Orange Lounge Toronto)
 "Devil in a Midnight Mass" (Live at The Orange Lounge Toronto)

Music video 
The video, directed by Phil Harder, is simple in concept; it is a performance piece with the band playing in an apartment while lead singer Ben Kowalewicz sings to the camera.  However, the frames run at a slower pace, implementing slow motion for dramatic effect. As the video progresses, things in the apartment (i.e.: dolls, glass containers, picture frames, windows) begin to explode, matching the tone and intensity of the song.  Things continue to explode until the end of the video, when Kowalewicz falls to the floor of the ravaged apartment. Kowalewicz's collapse is due to the uncut version, in which he gets shot through the head (explaining the random explosions as gunshots).

Chart performance

References

External links

2007 singles
Billy Talent songs
Rock ballads
Songs written by Ian D'Sa
Songs written by Benjamin Kowalewicz
Songs written by Jonathan Gallant
Songs written by Aaron Solowoniuk
Song recordings produced by Gavin Brown (musician)
2006 songs
Atlantic Records singles
Music videos directed by Phil Harder